The hybrid elm cultivar Ulmus × hollandica 'Fulva' is one of a number of cultivars arising from the crossing of Wych Elm U. glabra with Field Elm U. minor. Originally raised by Hesse's Nurseries, Weener, Germany, it was first mentioned in Mededeeling, Comite inzake Bestudeering en Bestrijding van de Iepenziekte 10: 9, 1932, but without description. Hesse's 1933 catalogue shows both U. fulva Hort. and U. fulva Michx..

NB. The tree should not be confused with Ulmus fulva, a synonym of the American Red, or Slippery, Elm now known as Ulmus rubra.

Description
Not available.

Pests and diseases
Unknown

Cultivation
No specimens are known to survive.

References

External links
 

Dutch elm cultivar
Ulmus articles missing images
Ulmus
Missing elm cultivars